Bartın Province, a small province in northern Turkey on the Black Sea, surrounds the city of Bartın.  It lies to the east of Zonguldak Province.

The town of Bartın contains a number of very old wooden houses in a style no longer extant in other places.

Bartın province includes the ancient port town of Amasra (Amastris). This town stands on two small fortified islands and contains many interesting old buildings and restaurants.

Districts

Bartın Province subdivides into four districts (capital district in bold):
 Amasra
 Bartın
 Kurucaşile
 Ulus

See also
 Bartın Naval Base
 Kuşkayası Monument
 List of populated places in Bartın Province

Gallery

References

External links

  Bartın governor's official website
  Bartın municipality's official website
  Bartın weather forecast information
  Bartin - Amasra
  Bartin - Amasra